Mission Nuestra Señora de la Soledad, commonly known as Mission Soledad, is a Spanish mission located in Soledad, California. The mission was founded by the Franciscan order on October 9, 1791 to convert the Native Americans living in the area to Catholicism. It was the thirteenth of California's Spanish missions, and is named for Mary, Our Lady of Solitude.  The town of Soledad is named for the mission.

After the 1835 secularization of the mission and the later sale of building materials, the mission fell into a state of disrepair and soon after was left in ruins. A restoration project began in 1954 and a new chapel was dedicated in 1955. The chapel now functions as a chapel of Our Lady of Solitude, a parish church of the Diocese of Monterey. The priests' residence was later recreated, and functions as a museum.

History

Mission era

Mission Nuestra Señora de la Soledad, La Misión de María Santísima, Nuestra Señora Dolorosísima de la Soledad, was founded October 9, 1791 by Fermín Francisco de Lasuén, the 13th of 21 missions in California.

The Chalon, a subgroup of the Ohlone were converted and resided there, followed by Esselen and Yokuts people. By 1803, there were 627 Mission Indians at Mission Soledad. At the Mission many Chalon married local Esselen speakers, while others married Yokuts  were brought into the mission between 1806 and 1834.

The mission's herds numbered 1,150 cattle, about 5,000 sheep, 30 swine, 670 horses, and 40 mules. Spanish Governor José Joaquín de Arrillaga was buried in the chapel after he died on July 24, 1814, during a visit to the Mission.

The mission was inundated by floods in 1824, 1828, and 1832, and following secularization (when Pio Pico sold the mission for a reported $800), the remaining buildings were looted for supplies. The mission's land became Rancho Ex-Mission Soledad.

Restoration and reconstruction

In 1954, when the Mission Soledad restoration was begun, only piles of adobe dirt and a few wall sections from the cuadrángulo (quadrangle) remained.  The chapel was reconstructed and dedicated under the auspices of the Native Daughters of the Golden West on October 9, 1955.  The ruins of the quadrangle, cemetery, and some of the outer rooms, while not restored, can still be seen.  Governor Arrillaga's grave was identified and given a new marker.

The Mission Nuestra Señora de la Soledad is now a functioning Catholic chapel and public museum.

See also
 Spanish missions in California
 List of Spanish missions in California
 USNS Mission Soledad (AO-136) – a Buenaventura Class fleet oiler built during World War II.

Notes

References
 
 
 
 
 
 
 
 
 Tapis, Estevan, OFM, State of the Missions of New California ... December 1803.

External links

 Official Mission Soledad website
 Mission Nuestra Senora de la Soledad: Early photographs and sketches archives - via Calisphere California Digital Library
 

Nuestra Senora de la Soledad
1791 in Alta California
Churches in Monterey County, California
Museums in Monterey County, California
History museums in California
Religious museums in California
1791 establishments in Alta California
Religious organizations established in 1791
California Historical Landmarks
History of Monterey County, California
Roman Catholic Diocese of Monterey in California
Salinas Valley